Baert is a Flemish surname particularly common in the Belgian provinces of West and East Flanders. It may be patronymic ("son of Baert") ([[Bart] (name)|Bart]]), though "baert" is also an archaic spelling of Dutch "baard", meaning "beard", and may have referred to a persons appearance or profession as a barber. People with this surname include:

Arthur Baert (1910–?), Belgian chess player
Barbara Baert (born 1967), Belgian art historian
Dirk Baert (born 1949), Belgian track cyclist
Dominique Baert (born 1959), French Flemish politician
François Baert (1651–1719), Belgian Jesuit hagiographer
Frans Baert (1925–2022), Belgian lawyer and philosopher
Jan Baert (1650–1702), Dunkerque corsair
Jean-Pierre Baert (born 1951), Belgian racing cyclist
Louis Baert (1903–1969), Belgian football referee
 (1932–1985), Belgian radio and television presenter
Patrick Baert (born 1961), Belgian sociologist and social theorist

Dutch-language surnames
Surnames of Belgian origin
Patronymic surnames